Coleophora guadicensis is a moth of the family Coleophoridae. It is found in Spain.

The larvae feed on Halimione portulacoides. They feed on the generative organs of their host plant.

References

guadicensis
Moths described in 1989
Moths of Europe